Simeon in the Temple or Simeons song of praise is an oil on canvas painting by the Dutch artist Rembrandt from c. 1669. It has been in the collections of Nationalmuseum in Stockholm since 1949.

According to the Gospel of Luke (2: 25-35), the pious Simeon had been promised by God not to die until he saw the Messiah. When the Christ Child was presented in the temple in Jerusalem, he understood that the Savior had come and praised God ("Nunc dimittis"). 

The painting was Rembrandt's last and remained unfinished at his death. The woman in the background, who either represents Mary or Anna the Prophetess, was probably added after artist's death by an unknown painter working in Rembrandt's workshop. 

Rembrandt had painted the same motif at least twice before: in Simeon and Anna in the Temple, and in Simeon's Song of Praise.

References

Paintings by Rembrandt
1669 paintings
Paintings in the collection of the Nationalmuseum Stockholm
Paintings in the Hamburger Kunsthalle